The 1987 LSU Tigers football team represented Louisiana State University (LSU) in the 1987 NCAA Division I-A football season. The Tigers played their home games at Tiger Stadium in Baton Rouge, Louisiana.

Schedule

Personnel

Rankings

Game summaries

at Texas A&M

Ohio State

A blocked Ohio State field goal attempt with five seconds remaining in the game spoiled a come-from-behind upset bid by the No. 7 Buckeyes and left them with a 13-13 tie at No. 4 LSU.

In the first meeting between the two programs, Tigers’ defensive tackle Karl Dunbar deflected Matt Frantz’s last-ditch 47-yard attempt that would have Ohio State back on tape after an early 10-3 deficit.

A quick LSU team drove 61 yards to a touchdown on its opening drive, and would eventually account for 348 yards of total offense.

Led by Tom Hodson’s 25-45, 267-yard passing day, LSU entered the second half with a 10-3 lead. Ohio State battled back for a 13-10 advantage with 11:07 to go in the game when Tom Tupa connected with Jay Koch from eight yards out.

Outside linebacker Mike McCray set up the go-ahead drive with an interception of LSU’s Mike Guidry at the Tigers’ 36.

With the score knotted at 13, cornerback Greg Rogan twice stopped LSU drives in the fourth quarter with interceptions, the second setting up Frantz’s potential game-winning effort.

Florida

David Browndyke kicked the go-ahead 24-yard field goal with 5:34 left.

at Georgia

Tommy Hodson threw a five-yard touchdown pass to Brian Kinchen for the go-ahead score with 3:36 left.

Alabama

Mississippi State

vs. South Carolina (Gator Bowl)

1988 NFL Draft

References

LSU
LSU Tigers football seasons
Gator Bowl champion seasons
LSU Tigers football